Regine Mispelkamp (born in Heilbronn on 9 December 1970) is a disabled equestrian from Germany. She won a bronze medal at the 2020 Summer Paralympics in the Individual Freestyle Test Grade V. Therefore, she was awarded on August 11, 2021 by the President of the Federal Republic of Germany with the Silver Laurel Leaf, Germany's highest sport-award.

References

External links 
 
 

1970 births
Living people
German female equestrians
German dressage riders
Paralympic equestrians of Germany
Paralympic bronze medalists for Germany
Recipients of the Silver Laurel Leaf
Equestrians at the 2020 Summer Paralympics
Paralympic medalists in equestrian
Sportspeople from Heilbronn
20th-century German women
21st-century German women